The All India Indira Congress (Tiwari) was a political party in India set up by dissident Indian National Congress party leaders Narayan Datt Tiwari, Arjun Singh, Natwar Singh and Rangarajan Kumaramangalam. Yashpal Arya , Sheila Dikshit The party later merged with the Congress party when Sonia Gandhi took over the party.

Election results

See also 
Indian National Congress breakaway parties
Indian National Congress (R)

References

1996 establishments in India
1998 disestablishments in India
Defunct political parties in India
Political parties disestablished in 1998
Political parties established in 1996
All India Indira Congress (Tiwari)